The equestrian events at the 1948 London Summer Olympics included dressage, eventing, and show jumping. All three disciplines had both individual and team competitions. The competitions were held from 9 to 14 August 1948, with the first five days held in the military complex at Aldershot, the endurance day on the army grounds of Aldershot at Tweseldown, and the jumping at the Empire Stadium in Wembley. World War II resulted in a greatly reduced number of competitors, including the absence of Germany, although Brazil made its first appearance in the equestrian events. 103 entries from 17 nations (Argentina, Austria, Brazil, Denmark, Finland, France, Great Britain, Ireland, Italy, Mexico, the Netherlands, Portugal, Spain, Sweden, Switzerland, Turkey, and the United States) competed. The youngest participant was Aëcio Coelho from Brazil at 23 years old, while the oldest rider was the Italian Alessandro, Count Bettoni Cazzago, at 55 years old.

Disciplines

Jumping
44 riders from 15 nations contested the 16-obstacle/19-jumping effort course. The 870 meter course had fences up to 1.60 meters in height, and was very slippery due to heavy rains during the week. One round of jumping was used for both team and individual competition.

Dressage
The dressage event had 19 riders from 9 nations. Since World War II had made training dressage horses hard, the difficulty of the test was reduced and only asked for 13 minutes of work with neither piaffe nor passage included. Only 3 judges were used rather than the traditional 5. Horses were also required to be ridden in an English saddle with a double bridle. They were not allowed to use martingales, bearing reins, bandages, gaiters or blinkers.

Eventing
45 riders for 16 countries rode in the eventing competition. Like the dressage competition, the requirements of the eventing were reduced. This included a shortened (3500 meter) steeplechase, lowering the speed of the roads and tracks phases from 240 to 220 meters/minute, and a shortened cross-country course at 33.5 km (compared to Berlin's 36 km course in 1936). The maximum height of both the cross-country and jumping were raised from 1.15 to 1.20 meters. The ground and terrain of the course were also challenging, taking place over difficult footing on a hilly course.

Medal summary

Medal table

Officials
Appointment of officials was as follows:

Dressage
  Albert-Eugène-Édouard Decarpentry (Ground Jury President)
  Carl Bonde (Ground Jury Member)
  Max Thommen (Ground Jury Member)

Jumping
  Xavier Bizard (Ground Jury President)
  Henry Somerset (Ground Jury Member)
  Arne Francke (Ground Jury Member)
  Michael Ansell (Course Designer)
  Phillip Blackmore (Course Designer)
  Ernest Haccius (Technical Delegate)

Eventing
  Gen. de Landrain (Ground Jury President)
  Ranieri, Count Di Campello (Ground Jury Member)
  Ernst A. Sarasin  (Ground Jury Member)
  Roger Moeremans d'Emaüs (Technical Delegate)

References

External links
 International Olympic Committee medal database

1948 in equestrian
1948 Summer Olympics events
1948
Equestrian sports competitions in the United Kingdom